Elena Meissner also called Elena Buznea-Meissner, (born Elena Buznea; 1867–1940) was a Romanian feminist and suffragist. She was the co-founder of the Romanian women's movement organisation Asociația de Emancipare Civilă și Politică a Femeii Române (1918) and its president in 1919.

Life
Meissner was born in 1867 in Huși, the former capital of the disbanded Fălciu County in the historical region of Western Moldavia. She was one of the first female students to attend the University of Iași in the 1880s. In 1905 she married politician Constantin Meissner (1854–1942).

She participated in several international women suffrage congresses as delegate of Romania.

Notes

References
 Francisca de Haan, Krasimira Daskalova & Anna Loutfi: Biographical Dictionary of Women's Movements and Feminisms in Central, Easterna and South Eastern Europe, 19th and 20th centuries. Central European University Press, 2006
 George Marcu (coord.), Enciclopedia personalităţilor feminine din România, Editura Meronia, București, 2012.

1867 births
1940 deaths
People from Huși
Romanian suffragists
Romanian feminists
Romanian women's rights activists
19th-century Romanian people